Bandy is a surname. Notable people with the surname include:

 Andi Muhammad Suryady Bandy (born 1981), Malaysian politician
 Daniel Bandy (born 1975), Australian rules footballer
 David Bandy (born 1978), Australian first-class cricketer
 Don Bandy (born 1945), former American football offensive lineman
 George Bandy (1945–2018), American politician
 Ina Bandy (1903–1973), humanist photographer
 Jett Bandy (born 1990), American MLB catcher
 Lou Bandy (Lodewijk Ferdinand Dieben) (1890–1959), Dutch singer
 Michael Bandy (born 1997), American football player
 Moe Bandy (born 1944), American country singer
 Orville Lee Bandy (1917–1973), American geologist
 Paul Bandy (born 1944), American politician
 Wallace A. Bandy (1880–1941), Illinois state representative and businessman
 Way Bandy (1941–1986), American makeup artist

Fictional characters
 Bartholomew Wolfe Bandy, the hero of the novels The Bandy Papers

See also
 Bandy, winter sport